The Singapore Free Press was an English-language daily broadsheet newspaper based in Singapore.

History
The paper was founded as Singapore's second English-language newspaper by William Napier, Edward Boustead, Walter Scott Lorrain and George Drumgoole Coleman on 1 October 1835 as the Singapore Free Press & Mercantile Advertiser. Napier edited the paper from foundation until 1846 when he returned to Scotland. Abraham Logan took over the paper in 1846 running the Free Press for the next twenty years. His brother, James Richardson Logan, ran the Penang Gazette which produced cross-pollination of copy between the two papers and a mutual dislike of the East India Company. The Free Press, by then edited by Jonas Daniel Vaughan, remained in circulation until 1869 when increased competition from The Straits Times led to its closure. In 1884 the paper went back into circulation under the editorship of Charles Buckley.

The Singapore Free Press was bought over by The Straits Times and was revived with its first publication on 15 May 1946, it was published as a daily. The bought over was mainly to fend off competition from Malaya Tribune, which was launched in 1914. The paper merged with the Malay Mail in on 28 February 1962.

References

External links
The Singapore Free Press article on National Library Board Singapore website
Search digitised copies of Singapore newspapers from 1831–2009

English-language newspapers published in Asia
Newspapers published in Singapore
Publications established in 1835
Publications disestablished in 1869
Publications established in 1884
Publications established in 1946
Publications disestablished in 1962